The International Maritime Rescue Federation (IMRF) is a global organisation that unites and represents the world's operational marine rescue services, whether civilian or military—full-time or voluntary—large or small. All member organisations are united in pursuit of one single humanitarian goal, "Preventing loss of life in the world's waters".

History

The first International Lifeboat Conference was held in London, England, in 1924. The conference, celebrating the 100th anniversary of the Royal National Lifeboat Institution, was attended by seven of the world's lifeboat organisations. It was unanimously decided by the attendees that an International Lifeboat Federation (ILF) should be established to promote, represent and support sea rescue services around the world. In 1985, the ILF was formally registered as a "non-governmental consultative organisation" by the International Maritime Organization (IMO), the United Nations specialised agency for international maritime affairs.

Back in 1924, before modern radio communication or rescue helicopters were in common use, coastal maritime rescue was almost always provided by small rescue craft operated by local communities. These rescue craft were traditionally referred to as "lifeboats", before the alternate meaning—the emergency evacuation craft carried on larger ships—became common.

As technology developed, so too did maritime rescue.  Most developed countries have centralised Maritime Rescue Coordination Centres, which can instantly receive maritime distress calls and co-ordinate rescue response using a range of modern maritime communication and positioning systems and search planning computers.  Modern Rescue Coordination Centres have a broad range of well equipped rescue assets at their disposal, which are manned by highly competent crews. Rescue response would include modern surface search and rescue units, rescue helicopters and fixed-wing search aircraft as well as a range of other specialised rescue and casualty treatment teams.

The ILF played an important part in IMO's Global Search and Rescue Plan, following the adoption of the 1979 SAR Convention, and in the evolution of the Global Maritime Distress Safety System. In 1998, the ILF was awarded the International Maritime Prize of the IMO, the first time it had been awarded to an organisation rather than an individual.

In order to reflect this broader scope of modern maritime rescue activity, carried out by its member organisations, and to remove any ambiguity over the alternate meaning of the word "Lifeboat", the International Lifeboat Federation decided to change its name to International Maritime Rescue Federation in 2003, the process being completed in 2007.

Operation

Today, the International Maritime Rescue Federation represents more than 90 organisations, from the world's largest maritime rescue services to new start-up organisations, which come from over 60 different countries all around the world.

The organisation is run by a small secretariat based in Stonehaven, Scotland and the DGzRS head of operations, Udo Helge Fox is chair of the trustees, with Bruce Reid as chief executive.

The most recent World Maritime Rescue Congress was held in Bremerhaven, Germany, in June 2015, devoted particularly to establishing a draft Code of Practice for the operation of search and rescue craft.

Maritime Incident Response Groups

Maritime Incident Response Groups (MIRGs) are specialized units of the IMRF responsible for containing disasters while at sea, most notably on-board ship fires. The European Union supports response groups under the EU's civil protection mechanism. Florika Fink-Hooijer was the first policy director at the EU dedicated to enhancing such cooperation.

References

External links

 International Maritime Rescue Federation
 World Maritime Rescue Congress

Sea rescue organizations